The Institute of Martinus Herman van Doorn (in Dutch Instituut Martinus Herman van Doorn) is a private boarding school in Apeldoorn, Netherlands.

Notable alumni
 Wilhelm Röntgen, physicist and Nobel laureate.

References

Apeldoorn
Secondary schools in the Netherlands
Boarding schools in the Netherlands